Neocarya is a genus of plant in family Chrysobalanaceae described as a genus in 1976.

It contains only one known species, Neocarya macrophylla, native to western and central Africa from Senegal to the Nigeria, and also in South Sudan. It is commonly known in English as the Gingerbread Plum, despite not being related to the true Plum (Prunus sp.).

References

External links
 

Chrysobalanaceae
Monotypic Malpighiales genera
Flora of Africa
Chrysobalanaceae genera